Pierina Burlando (September 2, 1916 – May 12, 1999) was an American film, stage and television actress. She was known for playing the role of Mama Rosa Novelli in the American crime drama television series Matt Houston. Santon died in May 1999 in Burbank, California, at the age of 82.

Partial filmography 

 Interrupted Melody (1955) - Mme. Gilly's Secretary (uncredited)
 The Wrong Man (1956) - Spanish Woman (uncredited)
 Full of Life (1956) - Carla Rocco
 Dino (1957) - Mrs. Minetta
 This Earth Is Mine (1959) - Mrs. Petucci
 Cry Tough (1959) - Señora Estrada
 The Miracle (1959) - Undetermined Secondary Role (uncredited)
 West Side Story (1961) - Madam Lucia (uncredited)
 Lover Come Back (1961) - Hotel Maid (uncredited)
 California (1963) - Dona Ana Sofia Hicenta
 Love with the Proper Stranger (1963) - Mama Rossini
 Captain Newman, M.D. (1963) - Waitress at Blue Grotto (uncredited)
 The Spy in the Green Hat (1967) - Grandma Monteri
 Don't Just Stand There! (1968) - Renée
 Funny Girl (1968) - Mrs. Meeker
 Kotch (1971) - Mrs. Segura
 The Last Word (1979) - Mrs. Tempino
 Rhinestone (1984) - Mother
 Fletch (1985) - Velma Stanwyk
 Short Circuit (1986) - Mrs. Cepada
 One Good Cop (1991) - Mrs. Cristofaro

References

External links 

Rotten Tomatoes profile

1916 births
1999 deaths
People from New York (state)
Actresses from New York (state)
American film actresses
American stage actresses
American television actresses
20th-century American actresses
American theatre people